Dolní Hbity is a municipality and village in Příbram District in the Central Bohemian Region of the Czech Republic. It has about 900 inhabitants.

Administrative parts
Villages of Horní Líšnice, Jelence, Káciň, Kaliště, Luhy, Nepřejov and Třtí are administrative parts of Dolní Hbity.

Notable people
Charles J. Vopicka (1857–1935), Czech-American businessman and diplomat

References

Villages in Příbram District